The 2015 CONSUR Men's Sevens championship was an Olympic qualification tournament for rugby sevens at the 2016 Summer Olympics which was held in Santa Fe, Argentina on 5-7 June 2015. It was the tenth edition of the CONSUR Sevens.
The tournament used a round-robin format, with the winners (Argentina) qualifying directly to the Olympics, and the second and third place teams (Uruguay and Chile respectively) qualifying for the Final Olympic Qualification Tournament.

Round-Robin

Final standings

See also
2015 CONSUR Women's Sevens

References

Rugby sevens at the 2016 Summer Olympics – Men's tournament
2015 rugby sevens competitions
2015 in Argentine rugby union
International rugby union competitions hosted by Argentina
Rugby sevens competitions in South America
2015 in South American rugby union